Bhurban is a small town and a hill station in Punjab province, Pakistan. The resort town is named after a nearby forest.

Location
Bhurban is situated in between Murree and Kashmir Road at a height of about 6000 feet.  It has recently been made accessible by the dual Islamabad-Murree Expressway, approximately a 50 km drive from Islamabad, the federal capital of Pakistan.

Tourism

Bhurban is a tourist destination with unique flora, and a fauna with a variety species not found elsewhere in Pakistan. It is known for the hiking trails in the nearby Ayubia National Park. The '5 star' Pearl Continental Hotel - Mount Pleasant Apartments is one of several resorts in Bhurban that serve tourists visiting the Murree Hills and the national park. Bhurban also has a nine-hole golf course. Another resort in Bhurban is the Bhurban Hill Apartments, located 2 km from PC Bhurban. It has its own source of natural mineral water.

Residents
Bhurban's main tribes are Dhunds (called Abbasis), Janyals, and Ahmedals, all being indigenous descendants of Muslim hill tribes who have lived here for centuries. Many of these tribes converted to Islam during the 14th to 15th centuries AD. Most of them still live simple rural lives, whilst a number of them have gone on to seek education and jobs in the plains, in Rawalpindi and Islamabad and even further afield.

The soil produced big names from Shahid Khaqan Abbasi (Former Prime Minister of Pakistan) to generals in army. The political influences as Late. Raja Ashfaq Sarwar one of the most honored personality.

Administration
The Rawat Union Council is also responsible for managing Bhurban. Rawat village is the headquarters of the Union Council of Rawat, which is an administrative sub-division of Murree Tehsil, in the Murree District of Punjab.

See also
Murree
Ayoubia National Park
Darya Gali
List of hill stations of Pakistan

References

Galyat of Pakistan
Populated places in Murree District
Hill stations in Pakistan
Tourist attractions in Murree